Daniel Woodley Prowse,  (September 12, 1834 – January 27, 1914) was a lawyer, politician, judge, historian, essayist, and office holder.

Born in Port de Grave, Newfoundland (now Newfoundland and Labrador, Canada), he was the fourth of the seven children of Robert Prowse and Jane Woodley. Prowse is the author of A History of Newfoundland which is considered one of the most complete and meticulous colonial history books in existence.

Educated in St. John's and Collegiate School in Liverpool, England, Prowse went to Spain to learn the family business before he returned to Newfoundland where he studied law and articled with Bryan Robinson and eventually was called to the bar in 1858. On March 19, 1860, in a bet, D. W. Prowse won a $6 hat from Mr. Moore by wearing his rifle dress down Water St.

Prowse also was an elected member of the Colony's House of Assembly for Burgeo-La Poile. In 1867 he was a proponent of the pro-confederated movement under Ambrose Shea. In 1869 he was appointed a judge of the Central District Court, an appointment he held until his retirement in 1898. Powers of a judge of the Central District Court were such that he was a Stipendiary Magistrate, a Justice of the Peace and a Circuit Judge. Prowse was also an avid hunter.

He was appointed CMG in the 1912 New Year Honours.

His brother Robert Henry also served in the Newfoundland assembly. The former town of Prowseton is named after him.

See also
 List of people of Newfoundland and Labrador
 List of communities in Newfoundland and Labrador

References
Biography at the Dictionary of Canadian Biography Online

External links 
 

1834 births
1914 deaths
People from Newfoundland (island)
Newfoundland Colony judges
Writers from Newfoundland and Labrador
Canadian Companions of the Order of St Michael and St George
Canadian King's Counsel
Members of the Newfoundland and Labrador House of Assembly